Adam Nowell (born 3 July 1984 in Liverpool, England) is a British professional basketball player, currently playing for Everton Tigers in the British Basketball League.

Nowell is an exceptionally quick player and his vertical leap is reputed to be upwards of 38 inches. He has a 40-yard dash time of 4.4 seconds and is perhaps most famous for dunking over Liverpool basketball legend Ken Chendo in 2003.

Adam states Magic Johnson and Isiah Thomas as his favourite Basketball players.

External links
Profile on the Toxteth Tigers website

1984 births
Living people
Mersey Tigers players
English men's basketball players
Sportspeople from Liverpool